Ride a Crooked Trail is a 1958 American Western film shot in CinemaScope and Eastman Color, with former World War II hero Audie Murphy and future Academy Award-winning actor Walter Matthau heading a strong if not well-known cast.

Gia Scala and Henry Silva co-star in the film, directed by Jesse Hibbs; his final feature film.

Plot
During his escape, bank robber Joe Maybe (Audie Murphy) sees famous US Marshal Jim Noonan, who is searching for him, stumble and fall off a cliff to his death. He enters a town on the dead man's horse, where he is mistaken for Noonan. Maybe decides to hide behind the badge for a while, but soon raises the suspicions of the local law enforcer, Judge Kyle (Walter Matthau). His real identity is nearly blown when the riverboat brings to town Tessa Milott (Gia Scala), a past acquaintance of Maybe's who calls him by his surname in front of the judge. Thinking quickly, Joe says she called him "Baby," and did this because she is his wife.

She must now pretend she is his wife to avoid further scrutiny from Kyle, but this in turn causes problems with her current boyfriend, bandit leader Sam Teeler (Henry Silva). The "couple" moves into a house and are well respected in town, although their secrecy is nearly compromised by a young orphan boy who expects "the marshal and his wife" to adopt him. Tessa struggles between her loyalty to her real criminal boyfriend and her growing feelings for Maybe, but each man wants to rob the town's bank.

Cast
 Audie Murphy as Joe Maybe 
 Gia Scala as Tessa Milotte 
 Walter Matthau as Judge Kyle 
 Henry Silva as Sam Teeler 
 Joanna Cook Moore as  Little Brandy (as Joanna Moore) 
 Eddie Little as Jimmy 
Mary Field as Mrs. Curtis 
 Leo Gordon as Sam Mason 
 Mort Mills as Pecos 
 Frank Chase as Ben 
 Bill Walker as Jackson 
 Ned Wever as Attorney Clark 
 Richard H. Cutting as Mr. Curtis
 Paul Newlan as Riverboat Captain (uncredited)

Production
The film was mostly filmed on the Universal backlot with some location shooting at the Janss Conejo Ranch in Thousand Oaks, California. During filming, Gia Scala learned her mother was dying of cancer and only had three months to live; the day after she heard the news, Scala was involved in a car accident caused by her drinking and driving.

See also
 List of American films of 1958

References

External links
 
 
 
 

1958 films
1958 Western (genre) films
American Western (genre) films
Audie Murphy
Universal Pictures films
Films directed by Jesse Hibbs
1950s English-language films
1950s American films